Grünfeld, Grunfeld, or Gruenfeld may refer to:

People
 Deborah H. Gruenfeld, American social psychologist
 Yehuda Gruenfeld (born 1956), Israeli chess Grandmaster
 A. Tom Grunfeld (born 1946), SUNY Distinguished Teaching Professor at Empire State College
 Alfred Grünfeld (1852–1924), Austrian pianist and composer
 Berthold Grünfeld (1932–2007), Norwegian psychiatrist, sexologist, and professor of social medicine
 Dan Grunfeld (born 1984), American-Romanian professional basketball player 
 Ernie Grunfeld (born 1955), American former professional basketball player
 Ernst Grünfeld (1893–1962), Austrian chess grandmaster and chess writer
 Heinrich Grünfeld (1855–1931), Bohemian-Austrian violoncellist
 Henry Grunfeld (1904–1999), merchant banker
 Isidor Grunfeld (1900–1975), dayan and author
 Nina Grunfeld (born 1954), British writer, journalist, public speaker, and entrepreneur
 Yehuda Grunfeld (1929/19301960), econometrician in the late 1950s

Other
 Grünfeld Defence, a chess opening

See also
 Greenfeld
 Greenfield (disambiguation)
 Gryunfeld (disambiguation)